Conservula is a genus of moths of the family Noctuidae described by Augustus Radcliffe Grote in 1874.

Description
Its eyes are naked and without lashes. The proboscis is fully developed. Palpi upturned and reaching vertex of head, thickly scaled where the third joint minute. Antennae simple in both sexes. Metathorax with tufts which are well developed in the American species, slight in other regions. Abdomen without tufts. Tibia spineless. Forewings with non-crenulate cilia.

Species
 Conservula alambica Gaede, 1915
 Conservula ancillottoi (Berio, 1978)
 Conservula anodonta (Guenée, 1852)
 Conservula anthophyes (D. S. Fletcher, 1963)
 Conservula cinisigna de Joannis, 1906
 Conservula clarki Janse, 1937
 Conservula comoriensis (Viette, 1979)
 Conservula furca (D. S. Fletcher, 1961)
 Conservula indica (Moore, 1867)
 Conservula malagasa Gaede, 1915
 Conservula minor Holland, 1896
 Conservula rosacea (Saalmüller, 1891)
 Conservula scriptura (Rougeot & Laporte, 1983)
 Conservula simillima Berio, 1966
 Conservula sinensis Hampson, 1908
 Conservula subrosacea (Viette, 1958)
 Conservula v-brunneum (Guenée, 1852)

References

Caradrinini